The Windauer Ache is a mountain stream in Tyrol, Austria, in the scenic Windautal valley in the Kitzbühel Alps.

In Hopfgarten the Windauer Ache discharges into the Brixentaler Ache at a narrow point in the valley; the Brixentaler Ache in turn empties into the River Inn at Wörgl.

The Ache flows through the municipalities of Westendorf and Hopfgarten.

The Windauer Ache is very popular for whitewater canoeing (grade WW II to WW V).

High water 
At the end of July 2006, a severe storm caused enormous damage throughout the entire Windau valley. The flood of the Windauer Ache tore away the stream shoring, bridges and road sections. The investment sum for the restoration - and simultaneous shoring and regulation of the river - amounted to approximately 860,000 euros.

References

Rivers of Tyrol (state)
Kitzbühel District
Kitzbühel Alps
Rivers of Austria